Litchfield Wetland Management District is located on the eastern edge of the Prairie Pothole Region in central Minnesota. District lands are located on over 150 waterfowl production areas scattered throughout seven counties. These areas vary greatly in size and vegetation and provide habitat for numerous plant and animal species.

References
District website

National Wildlife Refuges in Minnesota
Protected areas of Kandiyohi County, Minnesota
Protected areas of McLeod County, Minnesota
Protected areas of Meeker County, Minnesota
Protected areas of Renville County, Minnesota
Protected areas of Stearns County, Minnesota
Protected areas of Todd County, Minnesota
Protected areas of Wright County, Minnesota
Wetlands of Minnesota
Landforms of Kandiyohi County, Minnesota
Landforms of McLeod County, Minnesota
Landforms of Meeker County, Minnesota
Landforms of Renville County, Minnesota
Landforms of Stearns County, Minnesota
Landforms of Todd County, Minnesota
Landforms of Wright County, Minnesota